Music for Large & Small Ensembles is an album by Canadian jazz trumpeter Kenny Wheeler which was released in 1990 by ECM Records. 'The Sweet Time Suite' is Wheeler's most ambitious extended work for big band since 1969's Windmill Tilter.

Reception
The Allmusic review awarded the album 4½ stars. The Penguin Guide to Jazz Recordings selected the album as part of its suggested “core collection” of essential recordings.

Track listing
Disc 1: The Sweet Time Suite
 "Part I – Opening" – 2:19
 "Part II – For H./Part III – For Jan" – 10:09
 "Part IV – For P. A." – 9:26
 "Part V – Know Where You Are" – 5:36
 "Part VI – Consolation" – 9:19
 "Part VII – Freddy C/Part VIII – Closing" 12:53

Disc 2:
 "Sophie" – 8:50
 "Sea Lady" – 8:33
 "Gentle Piece" – 8:50
 "Trio" – 4:00
 "Duet I" – 2:40
 "Duet II" – 2:23
 "Duet III" – 3:04
 "Trio" – 5:44
 "By Myself" – 10:32

Personnel
 Kenny Wheeler – trumpet, flugelhorn
 Norma Winstone – vocals
 Evan Parker – soprano & tenor saxophone
 Ray Warleigh – alto saxophone
 Stan Sulzmann – tenor saxophone, flute
 Duncan Lamont – tenor saxophone
 Julian Argüelles – baritone saxophone
 Derek Watkins – trumpet
 Henry Lowther - trumpet
 Alan Downey – trumpet
 Ian Hamer – trumpet
 David Horler – trombone
 Chris Pyne – trombone
 Paul Rutherford – trombone
 Hugh Fraser – trombone
 John Taylor – piano
 John Abercrombie – guitar
 Dave Holland – double bass
 Peter Erskine – drums
 Jan Erik Kongshaug – engineer

References

Kenny Wheeler albums
1990 albums
ECM Records albums
Albums produced by Manfred Eicher